KJIC 90.5 FM,  serves the Greater Houston area with Christian Country Music. Their goal is to make available a country music sound, that is inspirational, family friendly, and yet reflects the sound of today's country music. Artists played on 90.5 KJIC include crossover artist such as Randy Travis, George Strait, Reba McEntire; Christian Contemporary crossovers such as Zach Williams, Rend Collective, and I AM THEY; and Christian country artist such as Kali Rose, Jason Crabb, and Guy Penrod. KJIC is owned and operated by Community Radio Inc.

DJ shows
 Monday-Friday: Rise & Shine with Sean...6am-9am
 Monday-Friday: Afternoons with Carla...3pm-6pm

 KJIC's History
 1981-Signs on the air as "KFTG 89.3" with118 watts.
 1987-KFTG changes frequencies from KSBJ and then began to broadcast with 440 watts.
1991-Built a new station and came on with 5,000 watts.
1993-There was an increase to 6,000 watts.
 2003-KJIC sells first station for funds to build a our own tower and to purchases a new transmitter.
 2003-Increased power from 7,700  kW 
2009-Increased wattage to 36,000

History
KJIC first came on the air in 1981 in Pasadena, Texas at 118 watts, playing Contemporary Christian music. The station later changed formats to include Southern Gospel as KSBJ came on the air. Soon KJIC was only playing Southern Gospel music. Around 1983, plans developed that would double the reach of KSBJ and KJIC if the two stations changed frequencies. Once this took place, both stations were able to grow in size and cover more listeners. KJIC grew from 118 watts to 400 watts.

During the 1990s, opportunities arose for the station to grow again, up to 7,700 watts.

In the early 2000s, the station once again had the ability to grow, to 36 kW, where it stands today. The station also raised enough money from selling 88.1 to buy its own land for a tower, and transmitter.

The bulk of the station's operating expenses are met from donations by the listeners. They also offer sponsorship announcements for businesses that support the station, and advertise events and concerts hosted by churches and other non profit ministries.

2018, The Board of Directors has taken a new approach to Country music. KJIC will play mainstream artists that sing about faith, family, or God. The messages in the songs must bring about encouragement, spiritual strength, or share about Christ ordained topics. The change brought about some troubles at first, as those who supported Traditional Southern Gospel, left. There we also some who claimed the station was not Christian, because the messages of some songs talked about faith, family, and love verus songs that speak of God directly. A few months went by, and now 90.5 KJIC has become a new platform for Christian listeners, and ranked the number 1 searched for Christian Country radio station on Google, over 10,000 weekly internet listeners from various parts of the world, and continues to grow.

Awards and achievements
 Top 10 Christian Radio Station for 15+ years from The Gospel Greats
 ICGMA Gold Award Radio Station of the Year 2011
 CGC Radio Station of the Year 2008
 Nominated Top 5 Favorite Radio Stations 2017 from Singing News Magazine
 Sean Vaughn (DJ) Golden Mic Award
 Bob Vaughn (GM) Heart Award from NAMM

External links

Listen Live to KJIC

JIC
Country radio stations in the United States
Radio stations established in 1972